Now You Know Oh No Ono is the debut EP of Danish band Oh No Ono, released February 15, 2005, on Morningside Records. It was recorded in November and December 2004.

Track listing
 "Hurrah Hurrah"
 "Fat Simon Says"
 "Ba Ba BaBa Ba Ba Well Anyway"
 "The Fool"
 "Am I Right?"
 "Always The Same"

2005 EPs